John Clark (born 13 March 1941) is a Scottish former football player and coach. He has been employed by Celtic for more than forty years over eight decades, since signing as a player in 1958, then having spells as a coach, assistant manager and currently kit controller.

He was a member of the Celtic team which won the European Cup in 1967, nicknamed the Lisbon Lions. He was inducted into the Scottish Football Hall of Fame in 2017.

Playing career
John Clark was born in Chapelhall, Lanarkshire. His father died in a railway accident when Clark was 10 years old. As a 15-year-old, Clark worked in a mine, before he joined Celtic in 1958, aged 17.

Clark soon established himself as a regular in the Celtic team. The arrival of Jock Stein as manager in 1965 saw Clark moved from left half to a sweeper position behind Billy McNeill. His undramatic style of play beside fellow centre back McNeill was integral to the success of the team; his role as Celtic's sweeper earned him the nickname "The Brush."

Between April 1965 and September 1967, the club's most successful period, he played in 140 consecutive matches. He was part of the Celtic team that won the European Cup in 1967, defeating Inter Milan 2–1 in Lisbon. As a player with Celtic, he won three league championships, three Scottish Cups, four League Cups and the European Cup.

He left Celtic for Morton in 1971, where he retired from playing two years later.

Clark earned four international caps for Scotland, all during his time with Celtic.

Coaching and management career
Clark became a coach with Celtic in 1973, working with the reserve team.

He left in 1977 to become Billy McNeill's assistant manager at Aberdeen, before returning to Celtic in the same role with McNeill from 1978 to 1983. During McNeill's tenure, Celtic won three League championships, in 1978–79, 1980–81 and 1981–82, the Scottish Cup in 1980 and the League Cup in 1982–83.

Clark then worked as manager of Cowdenbeath, Stranraer and Clyde, as well as junior club Shotts Bon Accord, in the 1980s and early 90s. He became Celtic's kit controller in 1997, a position he has held for more than twenty years. As of 2021, he has spent 46 years with Celtic across eight decades, making him the second-longest serving Celtic man ever, after Willie Maley.

His son Martin also became a professional footballer, playing with Clyde, Nottingham Forest and Partick Thistle in the 1990s.

Career statistics

International appearances

References

External links

1941 births
Living people
Scottish footballers
Scotland international footballers
Celtic F.C. players
Greenock Morton F.C. players
Scottish football managers
Celtic F.C. non-playing staff
Cowdenbeath F.C. managers
Stranraer F.C. managers
Clyde F.C. managers
Sportspeople from Larkhall
Larkhall Thistle F.C. players
Association football wing halves
Scottish Football League players
Scottish Football League representative players
Scottish Football League managers
Scottish Roman Catholics
Footballers from South Lanarkshire
Scottish Football Hall of Fame inductees
UEFA Champions League winning players